Sensabaugh is a surname. Notable people with the surname include:

Coty Sensabaugh (born 1988), American football player
Gerald Sensabaugh (born 1983), American football player